"Goodbye Mr A" is the second single by English pop rock band the Hoosiers, from their debut album, The Trick to Life (2007). The song is written in the key of B major and was created in memory of frontman Irwin Sparkes' secondary school English teacher, Jonathan "Mr A" Anderton, after Sparkes heard of Anderton's death in 2006. It has been noted for its similarities to Electric Light Orchestra's single "Mr. Blue Sky". Released on 8 October 2007, the song gave the band their second UK top-five single, entering the UK Singles Chart at  5 on 14 October 2007 and climbing to its peak of No. 4 the following week.

Music video
The music video to "Goodbye Mr A" is reminiscent of superhero comics and popular culture, such as the 1960s Batman television series. In the video, the Hoosiers kidnap Mr A, a comic-book character and the world's greatest superhero. They then take his place fighting crime as incompetent anti-heroes. Despite being fired into space at the end, Mr A. survives and opens his eyes; this is a reference to the film Fantastic Four: Rise of the Silver Surfer.

Track listing

Charts

Weekly charts

Year-end charts

Certifications

Use in other media
On 28 September 2007, the Hoosiers performed "Goodbye Mr A" on GMTV's Entertainment Today segment. The song is part of the soundtrack for the video game FIFA 08. It was also used in the 18 March 2009 episode of Waterloo Road. This song was featured in the Halfords "Easter Getaway" advertisement. The instrumental for this song has also been used in the second teaser trailer for Toy Story 3, which was released on 11 October 2009. It also appeared in the trailer for the film Juno. In 2010, it was used as the opening theme for the CBBC show, Hounded.

References

2007 singles
2007 songs
The Hoosiers songs
RCA Records singles